Roderick L. "Toby" Johnson Jr. (born September 1, 1991) is an American football defensive tackle for the New Jersey Generals of the United States Football League (USFL). He played college football at the University of Georgia after two years at Hutchinson Community College and was signed by the Tennessee Titans as an undrafted free agent after the 2015 NFL Draft.

Early years
Johnson attended Banneker High School in suburban Atlanta, where he played football, basketball and competed in track and field. Listed at 6'3", 240 lbs, he earned All-State honors as a tight end and All-Region recognition as a defensive end as a senior in 2010.

College career

Hutchinson Community College
Johnson attended Hutchinson Community College from 2011 to 2012, where he was teammates with Cordarrelle Patterson in his freshman year. Entering the 2012 season as the No. 1 overall junior college recruit in the nation, Johnson normally drew double teams and still put together a solid season despite missing the final two and a half games due to injuries. Johnson had a career-high seven total tackles against Dodge City on September 15. He had six tackles each against Air Force Prep and Independence. He recorded 37 total tackles (12 solo) with 6.5 of them for loss and three quarterback sacks. He also had four passes defensed. After the Blue Dragons won the Salt City Bowl, Johnson earned All-America honors along with three more Hutchinson teammates.

During his time at Hutchinson, Johnson posted 87 total tackles, 17 tackles for loss and five quarterback sacks. He also had nine passes broken up, a forced fumble, fumble recovery and two blocked kicks.

Georgia
On February 19, 2013, Johnson, who was rated a four-star recruit at defensive tackle and had narrowed his choices of more than 35 schools to Georgia, Auburn, Mississippi State and Oklahoma, signed a national letter of intent to play for the Georgia Bulldogs, becoming the first Blue Dragon to sign with Georgia in 17 years and Georgia's 33rd commitment of the 2013 class. He made the announcement at a news conference in the Humiston Athletic Center at the Sports Arena in Hutchinson, Kansas.

In 2013, Johnson appeared in only 10 games in a backup role for the Bulldogs due to a knee injury he suffered during his second season at Hutchinson and that was still affecting him when he arrived in Athens. On the season, he was credited with just seven tackles. The following season, he played in 13 games making four starts and recorded 27 total tackles, with five tackles for loss. On September 13, Johnson made his first career start at No. 24 South Carolina. He had his first career sack against Troy in Week 3. Against No. 9 Auburn, he registered a career-high six tackles. Johnson was recipient of the David Jacobs Football Scholarship award for the second-straight season.

Professional career

At Georgia's pro day, Johnson ran the 40-yard dash in 5.23 seconds with the wind and 4.84 seconds against the wind. He had a 26 1/2-inch vertical jump and an 8-foot-8 broad jump, completed the 20-yard shuttle in 4.65 seconds and the three-cone drill in 7.87 seconds and performed 25 strength lifts.

Tennessee Titans
Johnson was signed by the Titans on May 11, 2015 to their practice squad.  He was later released by Tennessee after preseason cuts.

Jacksonville Jaguars
On September 7, 2015, Johnson was signed to the Jaguars' practice squad but was released on September 15, 2015.

Chicago Bears
The Chicago Bears signed Johnson to their practice squad on December 16, 2015.  He was released on December 22.

Minnesota Vikings
The Minnesota Vikings signed Johnson to their practice squad on January 6, 2016. In Minnesota’s fourth preseason game against the Los Angeles Rams, Johnson made a diving interception that helped in the Vikings win. On September 3, 2016, he was released by the Vikings as part of final roster cuts and was signed to the practice squad the next day. On December 12, the Vikings promoted Johnson to the active roster after placing defensive tackle Sharrif Floyd on injured reserve. On December 17, 2016, the Vikings waived Johnson but was re-signed on December 20.

On May 17, 2017, Johnson was released by the Vikings.

Carolina Panthers
On May 18, 2017, Johnson was claimed off waivers by the Carolina Panthers. He was waived on September 2, 2017.

Detroit Lions
On December 30, 2017, Johnson was signed to the Detroit Lions' practice squad. He signed a reserve/future contract with the Lions on January 1, 2018.

On August 29, 2018, Johnson was waived/injured by the Lions and was placed on injured reserve. He was released a few days later.

Massachusetts Pirates
Johnson signed with the Massachusetts Pirates of the National Arena League for the 2019 season. He appeared in 9 games for the Pirates and recorded 7 sacks.

New York Guardians
In October 2019, the New York Guardians drafted Johnson in the 2020 XFL Draft's open phases. He had his contract terminated when the league suspended operations on April 10, 2020.

Massachusetts Pirates (II)
In April 2021, the Massachusetts Pirates (now affiliated with the Indoor Football League) announced that they had re-signed Johnson for their 2021 season.

New Jersey Generals

Career statistics

References

External links
Georgia Bulldogs football bio
Minnesota Vikings bio

1991 births
Living people
People from Moorhead, Mississippi
American football defensive tackles
Georgia Bulldogs football players
Tennessee Titans players
Jacksonville Jaguars players
Chicago Bears players
Minnesota Vikings players
Carolina Panthers players
Detroit Lions players
New York Guardians players
New Jersey Generals (2022) players